The president of the Regional Council (Italian: Presidente del consiglio regionale) is the Speaker who heads the consiglio regionale of a regione, a state-level territory.

See also
 Politics of Italy

Sources

Presidents